Conexión is the second live album by Spanish singer Ana Torroja. It was released under the label OCESA Seitrack on May 5, 2015. The album was recorded in Ciudad de México on December 3, 2014. The album includes material from her past five studio albums as well as 4 newly recorded songs. Featured guest include Paty Cantú, Leonel García, Miguel Bosé, Aleks Syntek, Carla Morrison and Ximena Sariñana.

Background 
The album was recorded in front of a selected audience attending a concert located in Mexico City.

Singles 
Of this material three singles were released: "Disculpa"; launched on February 16, 2015, "Barco a Venus"; launched on June 6, 2015 and "Un Año Más"; launched in October, 2015.

Track listing

Certifications

References 

2015 live albums
Spanish-language live albums